Ralf Salzmann (born February 6, 1955 in Kassel, Hesse) is a former long-distance runner from Germany, who represented West Germany in the men's marathon at the 1984 Summer Olympics in Los Angeles, California. There he finished in 18th position, clocking 2:15:29. Four years later, when Seoul, South Korea hosted the Games, he ended up in 23rd place (2:16:54). He won the Tiberias Marathon in 1982.

Achievements

References
 

1955 births
Living people
German male long-distance runners
Athletes (track and field) at the 1984 Summer Olympics
Athletes (track and field) at the 1988 Summer Olympics
Olympic athletes of West Germany
Place of birth missing (living people)
Sportspeople from Kassel
20th-century German people